Margit Åsberg-Albrechtsson (February 2, 1918 in Selånger – April 6, 1994)  was a Swedish cross-country skier who competed in the 1950s. She finished eighth in the 10 km event at the 1952 Winter Olympics in Oslo.

Cross-country skiing results

Olympic Games

References

1918 births
1994 deaths
People from Sundsvall Municipality
Cross-country skiers from Västernorrland County
Olympic cross-country skiers of Sweden
Cross-country skiers at the 1952 Winter Olympics
Swedish female cross-country skiers